Emmanuel Adeoye Adekola is an Anglican bishop in Nigeria: he is the current Bishop of Igbomina
in the Anglican Province of Kwara.

He was consecrated as Bishop of Igbomina at the Cathedral Church of St. James the Great, Oke-Bola, Ibadan,  on 30 July 2017.

Notes

Living people
Anglican bishops of Igbomina
21st-century Anglican bishops in Nigeria
Year of birth missing (living people)